For over 200 years, the Stadttheater Königsberg (Königsberg municipal theatre) in Königsberg was one of the most respected theatres in Prussia and in the German Empire.

History

Forerunner
The Königsberg theatre began with carnival games and school comedies at the beginning of the 16th century. In 1552, Conquest of Rome by Georg Sabinus was performed in the courtyard, and in 1573 The Fall of Man by the schoolmaster Roll. In 1605, Marie Eleonore of Cleves had English comedians perform for her in Königsberg Castle. In 1618, they played  Shakespeare. The first opera, Cleomedes by Heinrich Albert, was performed by students in 1635 before Władysław IV Vasa. In 1688 Christopher Marlowe's The Tragic History of Doctor Faustus was performed. Arranged by director Hilferding, the Schönemann company played Dr. Faustus, Molière's Tartuffe and Gottsched's The Dying Cato.

In 1753 Frederick the Great donated Kreytzenschen Square to the theatre director Konrad Ernst Ackermann to build a permanent theatre. With the money of businessman Friedrich Saturgus, Ackermann built the 300-seat theatre as the first in the Kingdom of Prussia. It was opened in 1755 with Racine's "Mithridate". Lessing's Miss Sara Sampson followed. Fearing the Seven Years' War, Ackermann left Königsberg in 1756 and went to Leipzig.

In 1768 Theodor Gottlieb von Hippel the Elder wrote the first theatre reviews in Johann Jakob Kanter's Königsberg Scholars and Political Newspapers. In 1769 director Karl Theophil Döbbelin performed Minna von Barnhelm. Caroline Schuch used the Singspiel between 1771 and 1787. In 1785 there were the first performances of The Robbers, The Fiesco Conspiracy in Genoa, Don Carlos and Clavigo. In 1788 the Schuch siblings brought The Abduction from the Seraglio, in 1793 Don Giovanni and in 1794 The Magic Flute.

In 1795 the theatre burned down. Plays continued in the old town of Junkerhof. The first performance of The Marriage of Figaro took place there in 1798. In 1800 a new theatre was built on the old site based on a design by Friedrich Gilly. After another fire, it was rebuilt in 1802. Director Steinberg brought Zacharias Werner's Consecration of Power, Wallenstein and Mary Stuart in 1803, Nathan the Wise in 1804 and The Bride of Messina in 1807. At the beginning of the Coalition Wars, songs by Max von Schenkendorf were performed. In 1809 Racine's tragedy Phèdre was staged. After that the theatre became a concert and society centre.

Municipal theatre

The foundation stone for the municipal theatre was laid in 1806 by the Minister for East Prussia of the German Empire Friedrich von Schrötter on Paradeplatz (Königsberg)). On 9 March 1808, director Carl Steinberg opened it in the presence of the court with the opera La clemenza di Tito. For unexplained reasons, the building burned down on 1 July 1808. The reopening took place in the presence of the royal couple in December 1809 with the festival The Consecration. The theatre premiered William Tell (Schiller) in 1810, and The Maid of Orleans in 1811. August von Kotzebue was the artistic director. In 1815, Iphigenia in Tauris and Götz von Berlichingen were performed. In 1819, director Hurray brought the first performances of Fidelio and Der Freischütz.

After the collapse of the theatre in 1828 and the dissolution of the ensemble, The Broken Jug premiered in 1830 and Faust in 1832. The world premiere of The Last Held of Marienburg by Joseph von Eichendorff in 1831 was unsuccessful. The composer Richard Wagner was Kapellmeister at the city theatre from 1836 to 1837. In 1836 he married the actress Minna Planer, who was engaged there, in the Tragheim Church. In 1854 the theatre received gas lighting. In return, they were allowed to watch the performance free of charge.

In 1879, under the direction of Max Staegemann and conducted by Emil Paur, the German premiere of Bizet's Carmen began, with which it began its global triumph. After the theatre collapsed again after 1890, the foyer was rebuilt and restaurants were added in 1893. In 1903 the theatre was fitted out with electrical lighting. At the beginning of the First World War, the theatre was rededicated as a hospital. Reopened on 27 August 1918 as a pure opera house, in 1924 it was merged with the New Playhouse to form the East Prussian State Theatre. The first performance of Der Rosenkavalier by Richard Strauss took place in 1927. In 1928 the city acquired both theatres. The history of the theatre ended in World War II when it burned to the ground during the air raids on Königsberg at the end of August 1944.

Directors and artistic directors
 Caroline Schuch
 1802: Carl Steinberg, son of Caroline Schuch
 1809: Anton Schwartz
 1810: Carl Steinberg
 1811–1812: Karl Friedrich Wilhelm Fleischer
 1813–1814: Carl Beinhöfer
 1816–1817: Daniel Huray
 1824–1827: Adolph Schröder
 Konrad Ernst Ackermann (to 1756)
 1763–1765: Franz Schuch the Younger
 Karl Theophil Döbbelin
 1834–1842: Anton Hübsch
 1843–1845: Friedrich Tietz
 1845–1876: Arthur Woltersdorff
 1876–1879: Max Staegemann
 1880–1883: Albert Goldberg
 1883–1886: Adolf Werther
 1886–1890: Andreas August Amann
 1890–1892: Heinrich Jantsch
 1892–1912: Adolf Varena
 1912–1914: Max Berg-Ehlert
 1914–1918: Max Richards
 1918–1920: Ludwig Hertzer
 1920–1928: Josef Geißel
 1928–1932: Hans Schüler

People 

The following people worked at the Königsberg City Theatre:
 , 1898–1912 stage painter.
 , actress
 Eberhard Keindorff, actor
 Louis Köhler, conductor and piano teacher
 Rudolf von Gottschall, dramaturge
 Richard Wagner, Kapellmeister
 Karl Franz Rankl, conductor
 Max Brode, concertmaster
 , from 1925 set designer and head of equipment

Literature
 Erhard Ross:  The history of the royal box in the Königsberger Schauspielhaus from 1809 to 1915. A contribution to the Königsberg theatre history.  In: Journal for Eastern Research, 43rd vol. (1994), Issue 1, pp. 54–70 (digitized version of the Bavarian State Library).
 Robert Albinus: Königsberg-Lexikon. City and Surroundings. Special Edition. Flechsig, Würzburg 2002, .
 Richard Armstedt: History of the royal. Capital and residence city of Königsberg in Prussia. Hobbing & Büchle, Stuttgart 1899 (German Land and Life in Individual Descriptions. 2, City Stories), (Reprint: Melchior-Verlag, Wolfenbüttel 2006,  (Historical Library)).
 Fritz Gause: The history of the city of Königsberg in Prussia. 3 volumes. 2nd / 3rd supplemented edition. Böhlau, Cologne a. a. 1996, .
 Baldur Köster: Königsberg. Architecture from the German era. Husum Druck, Husum 2000, .
 : Königsberg. History of a world citizenship republic. Hanser, Munich a. a. 2005, .
 Gunnar Strunz: Discover Königsberg. On the way between Memel and Haff. Trescher, Berlin 2006,  (Trescher series of trips).

References

External links 
 Kultur in Ostpreußen 

Theatres in Germany